Chichia is an extinct genus of prehistoric bony fish that lived during the Late Permian epoch.

See also

 Prehistoric fish
 List of prehistoric bony fish

References

Late Permian fish
Palaeonisciformes